The Castle of Linz is a castle in Linz am Rhein, Germany, built between 1364 and 1368 by Heinrich von Virneburg, who was the archbishop of Cologne at the time. The main function of the castle was to collect river tolls. During the Neuss War in 1475, the castle was besieged and badly damaged. From 1811 to 1851, it served as a prison. The castle lost its importance when the town of Linz am Rhein was sold to Prussia in 1820. In 1942–1945, during the Second World War, the castle was once again used as a prison. The structure today is now privately owned and used as a public venue.

References

Further reading 
 Laß, Heiko (2005). Der Rhein: Burgen und Schlösser von Mainz bis Köln. Petersberg: Michael Imhof Verlag. 
 Thon, Alexander; Ulrich, Stefan (2010). "... Wie ein Monarch Mitten in Seinem Hofstaate Thront": Burgen am Unteren Mittelrhein. Regensburg: Schnell & Steiner. .

External links 
Burg Linz history

Castles in Rhineland-Palatinate
14th-century establishments in the Holy Roman Empire